Güryıldız is a belde (town) in the central district (Tokat) of Tokat Province, Turkey. At  it is situated to the south of Black Sea Mountains and to the west of Tokat. The population of Güryıldız  is 2083  as of 2011. The settlement was founded  by Ahıska Turks from east. In 1999 it was declared a seat of township. Tomato and grape are the main crops of the town.

References

Populated places in Tokat Province
Towns in Turkey
Tokat Central District